Lamina dura is compact bone that lies adjacent to the periodontal ligament, in the tooth socket. The lamina dura surrounds the tooth socket and provides the attachment surface with which the Sharpey's fibers of the periodontal ligament perforate. On an x-ray a lamina dura will appear as a radiopaque line surrounding the tooth root. An intact lamina dura is seen as a sign of healthy periodontium. Lamina dura, along with the periodontal ligament, plays an important role in bone remodeling and thus in orthodontic tooth movement.

Under the lamina dura is the less bright cancellous bone. Trabeculae are the tiny spicules of bone crisscrossing the cancellous bone that make it look spongy.  These trabeculae separate the cancellous bone into tiny compartments which contain the blood producing marrow.

See also
Alveolar bone

Bones of the head and neck
Parts of tooth